Lusti may refer to several places in Estonia:

Lusti, Valga County, village in Karula Parish, Valga County
Lusti, Võru County, village in Antsla Parish, Võru County